Dendrobium macrophyllum, commonly known as the large-leaved dendrobium or pastor's orchid, is a species of Orchid.

It is native to Indonesia, Philippines, New Guinea, and some islands of the western Pacific (Solomon Islands, Fiji, New Caledonia, Samoa, the Caroline Islands).

Varieties
Three varieties of the species are recognized:

Dendrobium macrophyllum var. macrophyllum - most of species range
Dendrobium macrophyllum var. subvelutinum J.J.Sm. - New Guinea
Dendrobium macrophyllum var. ternatense (J.J.Sm.) P.O'Byrne & J.J.Wood - Sabah, Sulawesi, Ternate

References

External links

macrophyllum
Orchids of Asia
Orchids of Oceania
Orchids of Malaya
Orchids of Indonesia
Orchids of New Guinea
Orchids of the Philippines
Flora of Fiji
Flora of Samoa
Flora of the Solomon Islands (archipelago)
Flora of the Caroline Islands
Plants described in 1834